Kailash Kher (born 7 July 1973) is an Indian music composer and singer. He sings songs with a music style influenced by Indian folk music and Sufi music. He was inspired by the classical musicians' Pandit Kumar Gandharva, Pandit Hridaynath Mangeshkar, Pandit Bhimsen Joshi, and the Qawwali singer Nusrat Fateh Ali Khan.

Kailash Kher received the Padma Shri award in 2017 from the Indian government. He has also received two Filmfare Awards for Best Male Playback Singer: one for the Hindi film Fanaa (2006) and one for the Telugu film Mirchi (2013), along with several other nominations. With his powerful voice and his unique style of music, Kher has established himself as one of the most popular playback singers in India.

Early life and struggle
Kher was born on 7 July 1973 in Vinodnagar (now known as Mayur Vihar), Delhi, India in a Kashmiri family. His father Mehar Singh Kher was a traditional folk singer. Kher's first brush with music came in his childhood. Brought up in a musical atmosphere, from his school days, he was enchanted and fascinated by music and used to listen to his father's Indian folks songs all day.
Even as a four-year-old, Kher displayed natural musical talent and would often impress friends and family by belting out songs with his prematurely powerful voice.

At the age of 14, Kher left home in search of a guru or an institution to further his musical training, and he embarked on years of classical and folk music study. According to him, "it was because I wanted to pursue my passion for music. It required me to stay in isolation". He also attended music classes and would teach students for just ₹150 per session to maintain himself, taking care of all his personal expenses from lodging to food, plus his education and musical expenses. Although he couldn't find the right guru or a school, Kher started learning music by listening to it. He listened to Indian classical singers like Pandit Gokulotsav Ji Maharaj,  Pandit Kumar Gandharv, Pandit Bhimsen Joshi, and later even Nusrat Fateh Ali Khan, Lata Mangeshkar, and their contemporaries.

He then experimented with a family friend's Indian handicraft export business until 1999. However, when the business collapsed, he became depressed and even attempted suicide in early 1999. He went to Singapore and Thailand, and stayed there for six months.

Later, after relocating to Delhi with his family, he graduated from Delhi University through the correspondence program.

In 2001, Kher left Delhi for Mumbai, the center of India's highly competitive music industry, as a professional singer. For a while, Kher struggled, living in cheap hostels and doing whatever musical work he could find to make ends meet.

Career beginnings

Jingles
Kher had to struggle to get a chance in Bollywood. He got an opportunity to sing a song for the movie Andaaz. In this movie, his song "Rabba Ishq Na Hove" became more popular. His song "Allah ke Bande" from the obscure movie Waisa Bhi Hota Hai Part II became very popular and this song made him a popular singing star in Bollywood.

He sang a number of the songs in the Bollywood film Mangal Pandey: The Rising, in which he had a cameo appearance. His other famous song is "O Sikander" from Corporate. The song "Teri Deewani" from the album of the same name by his band Kailasa and the song "Ya Rabba" from the movie Salaam-e-Ishq: A Tribute to Love had record sales. He got an opportunity to sing for the film Baahubali 2: The Conclusion. In the film, his song "Jay Jay Kara" and "Jal rahi hai chita" became more popular.

A. R. Rahman commented,

Kher has a uniquely soulful, raw and high-pitched voice. I remember how I first heard of him. I had asked Mehboob, our lyricist, for a new voice that is earthy and strong, and he said, I have just the person for you. That voice can only be that of Kailash! And he sent Kailash to meet me. The moment I heard him, I knew that there was a voice that was so wonderful, and which had its own unique space... I want to say that Kailash Kher's voice has something that had been lacking a lot – it had pure soul! Allah Ke Bande is one of my all-time favorite songs.

Commercial music

He has given music scores for numerous movies like Chandni Chowk To China, Dasvidaniya, Sacred Evil, Sangini, Desi Kattey etc. He has also penned lyrics in a few movies like Chandni Chowk To China, Dasvidaniya, Kaal and Traffic Signal.[1]

By 2014, he had sung in more than 20 Indian languages including Malayalam, Tamil, Telugu, Kannada, Oriya, Bengali, Sindhi, Bhojpuri, Gujarati, Marathi, Punjabi, Konkani, Rajasthani, etc. for Indian films and more than 500 songs for the Hindi film industry and recorded more than one thousand radio and television advertising jingles.[2][3]

He has also ventured into the Kannada film industry. His hits from Kannada films include the songs "Hale Patre" from the movie Junglee and "Ekka Raaja Raani" from the movie Jackie.

He has composed and sung the title track of Star Plus's serial Diya Aur Baati Hum along with Shubha Mudgal. He has also sung the title track of Colors serial "Udaan" along with the anthem for Swachh Bharat Abhiyan, the national campaign for cleaning India.

Non-film work

Kailasa 
He formed Kailasa in Mumbai in 2004, with Mumbai-based musician brothers, Paresh Kamath and Naresh Kamath, whom he met in Mumbai.[1] The band's first album, Kailasa was released in March 2006. Their second album, Jhoomo Re, was released in May 2007.

Kailasa's third album, Chandan mein was released in June 2009 on the independent record label Cumbancha.[2]

He released his fourth album, Rangeele, which was released by his own company Kailasa Records in January 2012.

Kher has also sung a non-filmy Nepali pop songs such as "Phool Ko Thunga" and "Bolnai parcha bhanne K cha ra" from the album called Only Love in 2011.

2016 marks the return of Kher with his brand-new melodies, Ishq Anokha. This album, self-produced and distributed by SaReGaMa was a chartbuster shortly after its launch. Ishq Anokha comprises eight fresh numbers as 'Ishq Anokha', 'O Jogi', 'Meharbani Teri', 'Berukhiyaan', 'Vaari Vaari', 'Guru Ghantal', 'Turiya Turiya' and an electro version of the track 'Vaari Vaari'. The album had to be launched thrice, in 3 different metropolitan cities, Delhi, Mumbai and Kolkata.

Performances and international concerts

He has not only performed for the southeast Asian diaspora but also international audiences in festivals and venues such as GlobalFest at New York's Webster Hall, Kennedy Center (Washington D.C.), Stern Grove Festival (San Francisco), Celebrate Brooklyn, Santa Monica Pier Festival (LA), Fillmore Center (San Francisco), Hollywood Bowl (LA), Hammersmith Apollo (London), Symphony Hall (Birmingham), Massey Hall (Toronto).[1]
In 2007, he participated in a concert tour in North America entitled "The Incredibles", also starring Asha Bhosle, Sonu Nigam, and Kunal Ganjawala. In March 2011, Kailasa performed at the Kennedy Center in Washington, D.C., as part of the Maximum India festival.[2] Kher performed at the closing ceremony of the 2010 Commonwealth Games in Delhi.[3]

In 2012, as part of Kailasa's third Nepal tour, Kher performed at Dhaka in Bangladesh, Nairobi in Kenya, Zimbabwe and Congo, Karachi in Pakistan, and Muscat in Oman.[4]

Television and reality shows 
He has appeared in various television shows, including Wind of Change (Bangladesh) (Gaan Bangla),[1] Saregamapa Li'l Champs (Zee TV), Mission Ustaad (9X), Indian Idol 4 (Sony), IPL Rockstar (Colors) and Rock On (MTV).[2][3] In 2009, Kher appeared in Indian Idol 4 as a judge along with Javed Akhtar, Sonali Bendre, and Anu Malik.

In 2013, Kher collaborated with singer Shreya Ghoshal for the first time for a mission titled 'The Project Resound: Upgrade your Ears', in which Kher wrote, composed, and invited Shreya to sing along to a song named "Naina Chaar". This online initiative by Sony Music India aimed to make people aware of the rising technological advancement in the field of music, which may make it difficult to distinguish between noise and music. The project also promoted the use of Sony headphones.[4][5]

On 15 March 2014, Kher appeared in the celebrity talk show Comedy Nights with Kapil, on the special occasion of Holi celebrations.

Personal life 
Kher married Sheetal Bhan in February 2009, and their son was born in 2009.

Controversies 
Kher was accused of sexual misconduct by multiple women during the Indian Me Too movement in 2018.

Music for social causes 
In 2011, He composed a song called "Ambar Tak Yehi Naad Goonjega" for the anti-corruption movement led by Anna Hazare which is popularly known as the "India Against Corruption Movement". Kailash didn't charge a professional fee for singing this song.[10]

He lends his voice to the Clean India Mission theme song, ' Swachha Bharat Ka Irada Kar Liya Humne',[11] which is lyrical Prasoon Joshi. Taking forward the Clean India Mission, Kher visited several places in PM's parliamentary constituency drawing praise from Narendra Modi.

Bravo @kailashkher! I congratulate you for joining Swachh Bharat Mission in Varanasi. An admirable effort," the Prime Minister tweeted."[12]

Kher also did a viral video campaign called #KyaKisikoPadiHai along with Jose Covaco as a part of the Swachh Bharat Mission. The campaign was directed by Harnish Ambaliya.[13]

Kher was also invited by the PM to accompany him on his first USA tour, where they performed at the SAP center community reception in San Jose, California on 27 September'15.[14]

In 2019, Kher sang another song called "Bol Re Dilli Bol" which was again based on the ensuing political happenings in Delhi. Bol Re Dilli Bol song is part of the 7-episode web series titled "Transparency: Pardarshita".

Awards and nominations

Film awards and other honours

Discography/Filmography

See also
 Kailasa (band)

References

External links

 
 
 Rediff interview with Kailash Kher
 indiafm's Kailash Kher filmography

1973 births
Living people
Indian male playback singers
Indian male singers
Indian film score composers
Kannada playback singers
Telugu playback singers
Tamil playback singers
Bengali-language singers
Recipients of the Padma Shri in arts
Indian male film score composers
Kashmiri people
Filmfare Awards winners